Sebago Lake State Park is a public recreation area encompassing  on the north shore of Sebago Lake in the towns of Naples and Casco, Cumberland County, Maine. It opened in 1938 as one of Maine's original five state parks.  The mostly forested park is divided into east and west sections by the Songo River. It is managed by the Maine Department of Agriculture, Conservation and Forestry.

Activities and amenities
The park offers 250 campsites in two campgrounds, Naples Beach and Witch Cove, each with beaches and boat ramps. Boating and swimming are also available at the day-use area in the park's east section. Other park features include hiking trails and roadway biking.

Geology 
The primary geological unit of Sebago Lake State Park is the Sebago Granite.

References

External links

 Sebago Lake State Park Department of Agriculture, Conservation and Forestry
Sebago Lake State Park Map Department of Agriculture, Conservation and Forestry

Beaches of Maine
State parks of Maine
Lakes of Cumberland County, Maine
Protected areas of Cumberland County, Maine
Naples, Maine
Casco, Maine
Landforms of Cumberland County, Maine
Lakes of Maine
Campgrounds in Maine
Parks in Cumberland County, Maine